The International Symposium on Computer Architecture (ISCA) is an annual academic conference on computer architecture, generally viewed as the top-tier in the field. Association for Computing Machinery's Special Interest Group on Computer Architecture (ACM SIGARCH) and Institute of Electrical and Electronics Engineers Computer Society are technical sponsors.

ISCA has participated in the Federated Computing Research Conference in 1993, 1996, 1999, 2003, 2007, 2011 and 2015, every year that the conference has been organized.

Influential Paper Award
The ISCA Influential Paper Award is presented annually at ISCA by SIGARCH and TCCA. The award is given for the paper with the most impact in the field (in the area of research, development, products, or ideas) from the conference 15 years ago.

Prior recipients include:
 2022 (For ISCA 2007): Xiaobo Fan, Wolf-Dietrich Weber, Luiz André Barroso. "Power Provisioning for a Warehouse-sized Computer"
 2021 (For ISCA 2006): James Donald, Margaret Martonosi. "Techniques for Multicore Thermal Management: Classification and New Exploration"
 2020 (For ISCA 2005): Rakesh Kumar, Victor V. Zyuban, Dean M. Tullsen. "Interconnections in Multi-Core Architectures: Understanding Mechanisms, Overheads and Scaling"
 2019 (For ISCA 2004): Lance Hammond, Vicky Wong, Mike Chen, Brian D. Carlstrom, John D. Davis, Ben Hertzberg, Manohar K. Prabhu, Honggo Wijaya, Christos Kozyrakis, Kunle Olukotun. "Transactional Memory Coherence and Consistency"
 2018 (For ISCA 2003): Kevin Skadron, Mircea R. Stan, Karthik Sankaranarayanan, Wei Huang, Sivakumar Velusamy, David Tarjan. "Temperature-Aware Microarchitecture"
 2017 (2002) - Krisztian Flautner, Nam Sung Kim, Steven Martin, David Blaauw, Trevor Mudge. "Drowsy caches: simple techniques for reducing leakage power"
 2016 (2001) - Brian Fields, Shai Rubin, Rastislav Bodík,
 2015 (2000) - David Brooks, Vivek Tiwari, and Margaret Martonosi,
 2014 (1999) - Seth Copen Goldstein, Herman Schmit, Matthew Moe, Mihai Budiu, Srihari Cadambi, R. Reed Taylor, and Ronald Laufer
 2013 (1998) - Srilatha Manne, Artur Klauser, Dirk Grunwald,
 2012 (1997) - Subbarao Palacharla, Norman P. Jouppi, James E. Smith
 2011 (1996) - Dean M. Tullsen, Susan J. Eggers, Joel S. Emer, Henry M. Levy, Jack L. Lo, and Rebecca L. Stamm
 2010 (1995) - Dean M. Tullsen, Susan J. Eggers, and Henry M. Levy
 2009 (1994) - Jeffrey Kuskin, David Ofelt, Mark Heinrich, John Heinlein, Richard Simoni, Kourosh Gharachorloo, John Chapin, David Nakahira, Joel Baxter, Mark Horowitz, Anoop Gupta, Mendel Rosenblum, and John L. Hennessy
 2008 (1993) - Maurice Herlihy and J. Eliot B. Moss,
 2007 (1992) - Tse-Yu Yeh and Yale N. Patt
 2006 (1991) - Pohua P. Chang, Scott A. Mahlke, William Y. Chen, Nancy J. Warter, and Wen-mei W. Hwu
 2005 (1990) - Norman P. Jouppi,
 2004 (1989) - Steven Przybylski, John L. Hennessy, and Mark Horowitz
 2003 (1988) - Jean-Loup Baer and Wen-Hann Wang

References

External links
 ISCA proceedings in the ACM digital library
 ISCA proceedings information in DBLP
 ISCA 2017 web site
 Recent symposiums
 ACM SIGARCH/IEEE-CS TCCA Influential ISCA Paper Award

Computer science conferences
Computer architecture conferences
Association for Computing Machinery conferences
Recurring events established in 1973